Ante or Antes may refer to:
 Ante (cards), an initial stake paid in a card game
 Ante (poker), a forced bet in the game of poker
 Ante (name), Croatian form of the given name Anthony
 The Latin word ante, meaning "before", which is used as a prefix in many Latin phrases. e.g. antebellum, meaning "before a war"
 Sivry-Ante, a municipality in the Marne department of France with two villages: Ante and Sivry-Ante
 Antes (people)

See also

 Antes (disambiguation)
Anth (disambiguation)